Victor Reinganum (1907–1995) was a British artist and illustrator, probably best known for his illustrations on book dustjackets, including the first editions of Muriel Spark's The Ballad of Peckham Rye (1960) and The Prime of Miss Jean Brodie (1961).

Reinganum was born in London, England, on 13 September 1907 and died on 24 January 1995, aged 87.

During 1925–1928, Reinganum studied at Heatherley School of Fine Art and the Académie Julian, Paris, also taking private lessons with Léger. In 1928, he joined Elstree Studios and was an art director there until 1929 when he became a freelance illustrator. He was a prolific contributor to the Radio Times, including the cover of at least one Christmas issue. In 1960 he designed the first Radio Times cover to mark the Eurovision Song Contest.

The book Surrealism in England – 1936 and After (1986) says of him:

References

External links
 Diagram (1939) in the Tate Gallery, UK
 The Three Graces (1968) in the Paisnel Gallery, London
 Victor Reinganum at artprice.com
 Victor Reinganum at classiccrimefiction.com
 Christmas 1941 issue of Radio Times, page 2, with illustration by Reinganum

1907 births
1995 deaths
Artists from London
English illustrators
British surrealist artists
Alumni of the Heatherley School of Fine Art
Académie Julian alumni